is a Japanese football player for Maruyasu Okazaki.

Club statistics
Updated to 23 February 2018.

References

External links
Profile at FC Gifu

1993 births
Living people
Juntendo University alumni
Association football people from Shizuoka Prefecture
Japanese footballers
J2 League players
J3 League players
Japan Football League players
FC Gifu players
Thespakusatsu Gunma players
FC Maruyasu Okazaki players
Association football midfielders